Zahir Belounis (born 15 February 1980) is a French-Algerian football player who plays as a striker. The refusal of authorities in Qatar, where he was playing football, to grant him an exit visa after a pay dispute, brought him to wider attention.

Career
Belounis played as a striker for lower league French and Swiss clubs before moving to Qatar in 2007. He played for the El Jaish SC.
 
He was in a dispute over unpaid wages from 2010 but because in Qatar, the employer has control over exit visas under the Kafala system, he was unable to leave the country. Belounis threatened to go on hunger strike to draw attention to his cause and in 2013, he wrote an open letter to 2022 World Cup ambassadors Zinedine Zidane and Pep Guardiola to garner support. FIFA declined to take up his case as Belounis had appealed via the Qatari authorities and not through FIFA.

After 19 months he was granted an exit visa and left Qatar to return to France. Belounis admitted that during his time awaiting an exit visa he had planned to leave Qatar illegally, considered suicide and had turned to alcohol to help him cope with his situation.

The case drew attention to Qatari employment laws and their interaction with their hosting of the 2022 World Cup.

References

External links
http://www.fifpro.org/news/news_details/2413

1980 births
Qatar Stars League players
Living people
French footballers
Association football forwards
Expatriate footballers in Malaysia
Expatriate footballers in Qatar
French expatriate footballers
French sportspeople of Algerian descent
Sportspeople from Saint-Maur-des-Fossés
FC Saint-Lô Manche players
Footballers from Val-de-Marne